Bahuzi (also spelled Bhozy) is a village in northwestern Syria, administratively part of the Tartus Governorate. It is located between Safita (to the east) and Ras al-Khashufah (to the west). According to the Syria Central Bureau of Statistics (CBS), Bahuzi had a population of 1,801 in the 2004 census. Its inhabitants are predominantly Alawites.

References

Populated places in Tartus District
Alawite communities in Syria